Omary Ally Mwanga (born 31 December 1995), known professionally as Marioo, is a Tanzanian singer, songwriter, poet, and music producer. He was born in Temeke, Dar es Salaam and later on he was moved to Kibiti District to live with his grandmother. Omary now lives in Dar es Salaam,mikocheni where he writes, performs, and releases primarily bongo flava and kiswahili amapiano music. In 2022, Omary won 3 Tanzanian Music Awards from 7 nominations. Rolling Stone magazine ranked Marioo 39 on its 40 afropop songs of 2022. 

Marioo released his debut album “The Kid You Know” on December 9th 2022.

NotJustOk's and Tanzanian music journalist, Charles Maganga praised "The Kid You Know" album by stating that the album has "established Marioo as a mega Bongo Fleva star " and acclaimed Marioo's versatility as Marioo " explored different musical styles such as Amapiano, Afrobeats, and R&B while remaining true to his Bongo Fleva

Early life 
Omary Mwanga was born in  Temeke Dar es salaam to  Wandengereko parents from Pwani region of Tanzania. When he was a kid he was sent to live with his grandmother in kibiti, Pwani region where he studied Primary school and later on joined secondary school. When he was at form one in secondary school he dropped out of school and moved Temeke, Dar Es Salaam to live with his mother again. While in Dar Es Salaam Marioo started working at his uncle's garage as a motor vehicle mechanic. It was during this time when he started writing songs for other musicians. In 2015, he recorded vocals of his first song, "Dar Kugumu". In 2018 he mixed, made a video, and released "Dar Kugumu" in 2018. "Dar Kugumu" was put on rotation in Dar es Salaam and Nairobi, beginning Omary's career as a musician.

Discography

Awards

References

External links

 

1995 births
Living people
People from Pwani Region
Tanzanian musicians
Swahili-language singers
21st-century Tanzanian male singers
Tanzanian Bongo Flava musicians